Piyaro Lund is a town and union council of Tando Allahyar District in the Sindh Province of Pakistan name="Tand">Official website of District Government Tando Allahyar </ref> it has a population of 23,613.

See also
 Ramapir Temple Tando Allahyar

References

http://www.tiict.com.pk/
Union councils of Sindh
Populated places in Sindh